The Landing Craft, Mechanized Mark 2 or LCM (2) was a landing craft used for amphibious landings early in the United States' involvement in the  Second World War. Though its primary purpose was to transport light tanks from ships to enemy-held shores, it was also used to carry guns and stores. The craft was designed by the Navy's Bureau of Construction and Repair and the initial production contract was let to the American Car & Foundry Company. A total of 147 were built by this company and Higgins Industries. Because of its light load capacity and the rapid production of the superseding LCM (3), the LCM (2) quickly fell out of use following the Allied invasion of North Africa in 1942.

Constructed of steel, this shallow-draft, barge-like boat could ferry a small armored vehicle to shore at 7.5 knots (17 km/h).  The craft was generally carried on the deck of a transport ship and then lowered into the water, a few miles from its objective, by crane or derrick. The cargo was then placed into the craft by crane or derrick. Once the LCM (2) had touched down on shore, the hinged ramp at the bow  of the craft was lowered and the tank left the craft over the ramp under its own power.

Origins
As early as 1930, the United States Marine Corps was interested in landing tankettes on beaches along with assaulting infantry. By the mid-1930s, Marine planners had  settled on a beach assault procedure that involved a purpose built craft for the initial assault wave, ships' boats and cutters for follow-on troops, and a purpose built tank lighter for vehicles, guns,  and supplies.  Nevertheless, progress was difficult and slow due to lack of funding. Also, the Navy placed restrictions on such craft – considering transportation and deployment of them from available ships. By 1940, prototypes, of 38-foot to 40-foot long vessels, had been built and tested. The positive attributes of these were recognized and, by September 1940, the USMC had made known their requirements for a tank landing craft. The Navy's Bureau of Construction and Repair produced a 45-foot lighter capable of carrying the 15 ton Army model tank the Marines anticipated using. What evolved became the LCM (2), although at the time it was referred to using the Marine Corps designation of YL.

Service history

The war time US Navy publication Allied Landing Craft and Ships describes the operational use of the LCM (2) as "To land one light tank or motor vehicle."

In early August 1942, when the US Navy expedition arrived at Guadalcanal, it contained 48 LCM (2)s; almost the Navy's entire inventory of LCMs. The force also had a small assortment of earlier designs of barges and ponts, plus 116 Landing Craft Vehicle (LCV)s, each able to hold 10,000-pounds of cargo, such as a 75mm pack howitzer, a 105mm howitzer, or 1-ton truck, but heavier equipment (90mm and 5 inch guns, heavy trucks, and the Marines' tanks) would have to be carried in the LCM (2)s.

In early November 1942, these craft operated with the Western Task Force, landing in the Casablanca area during Operation Torch. In July 1943, they saw limited service during the Sicily landings and a few still served as late as the Salerno landings in September 1943.

See also

LCP (L)
LCM (1)
LCVP (United States)
Landing Craft Mechanized
Landing Ship, Infantry

Footnotes

Notes

Citations

References
Fergusson, Bernard The Watery Maze; the story of Combined Operations, Holt, New York, 1961.
Friedman, Norman U.S. Amphibious Ships and Craft: An Illustrated Design History, Naval Institute Press, Annapolis, 2002. 
Hough, Frank, et al., Pearl Harbor to Guadalcanal History of U. S. Marine Corps Operations in World War II Volume 1, US Marine Corps, Washington DC, 1958.
Ladd, JD Assault From the Sea: 1939–1945, Hippocrene Books, Inc., New York, 1976. 
Maund, LEH Assault From the Sea, Methuen & Co. Ltd., London 1949.
Miller, John Guadalcanal: The First Offensive, US Government Printing Office, Washington, D.C., 1949.
Morison, Samuel Eliot, The Struggle for Guadalcanal, August 1942 – February 1943 Little, Brown, 1947
Smith, W.H.B. Basic Manual of Military Small Arms Stackpole Books, Harrisburg PA 
US Navy ONI 226 Allied Landing Craft and Ships, US Government Printing Office, 1944.

Landing craft
Military vehicles introduced from 1940 to 1944